The 1916 Berwick-upon-Tweed by-election was held on 16 August 1916. The by-election was held due to the elevation to the peerage of the incumbent Liberal MP, Sir Edward Grey.

It was won by the Liberal candidate Sir Francis Blake. Blake was unopposed by Conservative or Labour candidates due to a war time electoral truce where the three main parties would not put up candidates against one another. This meant that Blake was sometimes referred to as a "Coalitionist".  The unsuccessful candidate, Dr Arthur Turnbull, stood as an Independent, though one source has described him as an Independent Liberal.

References

1916 elections in the United Kingdom
1916 in England
20th century in Northumberland
History of Berwick-upon-Tweed
By-elections to the Parliament of the United Kingdom in Northumberland constituencies
August 1916 events